Glycogenolysis is the breakdown of glycogen (n) to glucose-1-phosphate and glycogen (n-1). Glycogen branches are catabolized by the sequential removal of glucose monomers via phosphorolysis, by the enzyme glycogen phosphorylase.

Mechanism

In the muscles, glycogenolysis begins due to the binding of cAMP to phosphorylase kinase, converting the latter to its active form so it can convert phosphorylase b to phosphorylase a, which is responsible for catalyzing the breakdown of glycogen. 

The overall reaction for the breakdown of glycogen to glucose-1-phosphate is:
 glycogen(n residues) + Pi  glycogen(n-1 residues) + glucose-1-phosphate
Here, glycogen phosphorylase cleaves the bond linking a terminal glucose residue to a glycogen branch by substitution of a phosphoryl group for the α[1→4] linkage.

Glucose-1-phosphate is converted to glucose-6-phosphate (which often ends up in glycolysis) by the enzyme phosphoglucomutase.

Glucose residues are phosphorolysed from branches of glycogen until four residues before a glucose that is branched with a α[1→6] linkage. Glycogen debranching enzyme then transfers three of the remaining four glucose units to the end of another glycogen branch. This exposes the α[1→6] branching point, which is hydrolysed by α[1→6] glucosidase, removing the final glucose residue of the branch as a molecule of glucose and eliminating the branch. This is the only case in which a glycogen metabolite is not glucose-1-phosphate. The glucose is subsequently phosphorylated to glucose-6-phosphate by hexokinase.

Function
Glycogenolysis takes place in the cells of the muscle and liver tissues in response to hormonal and neural signals. In particular, glycogenolysis plays an important role in the fight-or-flight response and the regulation of glucose levels in the blood.

In myocytes (muscle cells), glycogen degradation serves to provide an immediate source of glucose-6-phosphate for glycolysis, to provide energy for muscle contraction.

In hepatocytes (liver cells), the main purpose of the breakdown of glycogen is for the release of glucose into the bloodstream for uptake by other cells. The phosphate group of glucose-6-phosphate is removed by the enzyme glucose-6-phosphatase, which is not present in myocytes, and the free glucose exits the cell via GLUT2 facilitated diffusion channels in the hepatocyte cell membrane.

Regulation
Glycogenolysis is regulated hormonally in response to blood sugar levels by glucagon and insulin, and stimulated by epinephrine during the fight-or-flight response. Insulin potently inhibits glycogenolysis.

In myocytes, glycogen degradation may also be stimulated by neural signals.

Clinical significance
Parenteral (intravenous) administration of glucagon is a common human medical intervention in diabetic emergencies when sugar cannot be given orally. It can also be administered intramuscularly.

Pathology

See also
 Glycogenesis

References

External links

 The chemical logic of glycogen degradation at ufp.pt
 

Metabolic pathways
Hepatology
Diabetes